KFFX-TV (channel 11) is a television station licensed to Pendleton, Oregon, United States, serving the Tri-Cities, Washington area as an affiliate of Fox and Telemundo. It is the only major commercial station in the Tri-Cities area that is licensed to the Oregon side of the market. Owned by Imagicomm Communications, KFFX-TV has studios on Clearwater Avenue in Kennewick, Washington, and its transmitter is located in the Umatilla National Forest east of Pendleton.

KCYU-LD (channel 41) in Yakima, Washington, operates as a low-power semi-satellite of KFFX-TV. It simulcasts all Fox network and syndicated programming as provided by KFFX-TV, and the two stations share a website. However, KCYU-LD airs separate legal identifications and commercial inserts. KFFX-TV serves the eastern half of the Tri-Cities/Yakima market while KCYU-LD serves the western portion. On satellite, KFFX-TV is only available on DirecTV, while Dish Network carries KCYU-LD instead.

History
Channel 11 signed on the air January 11, 1999 as KAUP; on April 25, the call letters were changed to KFFX-TV. It was the first full-powered VHF station in what had previously been a "UHF island." It was also the first station on the Tri-Cities side of the market not to be a satellite of a station in Yakima.

The station replaced KBWU-LP (channel 66), a low-power semi-satellite of KAYU-TV in Spokane (which was carried by cable providers throughout southeastern Washington and northeastern Oregon); KCYU-LP was also a semi-satellite of KAYU before the launch of KFFX. KBWU (which originally had the call sign K66BW, though it was referred to as "KBW" outside of station identifications) had been on the air since October 1, 1989; that station, now KBWU-LD (channel 36), is now a translator of KFFX.

Initially, the KFFX-TV license was owned by Communication Properties; Northwest Broadcasting, through its Mountain Broadcasting subsidiary, operated the station under a local marketing agreement. Northwest filed to acquire KFFX outright in November 1999; however, the sale, approved on September 27, 2000, was not completed until January 14, 2003 because Northwest was required to divest another full-power television station in the Tri-Cities market, KBKI (channel 9, later known as KCWK) in Walla Walla, in order to complete its purchase of KFFX. KBKI was ultimately acquired by Pappas Telecasting.

In February 2019, Reuters reported that Apollo Global Management had agreed to acquire the entirety of Brian Brady's television portfolio, which it intends to merge with Cox Media Group (which Apollo is acquiring at the same time) and stations spun off from Nexstar Media Group's purchase of Tribune Broadcasting, once the purchases are approved by the FCC. In March 2019 filings with the FCC, Apollo confirmed that its newly-formed broadcasting group, Terrier Media, would acquire Northwest Broadcasting, with Brian Brady holding an unspecified minority interest in Terrier. In June 2019, it was announced that Terrier Media would instead operate as Cox Media Group, as Apollo had reached a deal to also acquire Cox's radio and advertising businesses. The transaction was completed on December 17.

On March 29, 2022, Cox Media Group announced it would sell KFFX-TV, KCYU-LD and 16 other stations to Imagicomm Communications, an affiliate of the parent company of the INSP cable channel, for $488 million; the sale was completed on August 1.

Newscasts
KFFX airs a 10 p.m. newscast, Fox First at Ten, produced by area NBC affiliate KNDO/KNDU and a 7–9 a.m. newscast, Good Day produced by Spokane's NBC affiliate KHQ-TV.

Technical information

Subchannels
The station's digital signal is multiplexed:

KFFX has been digital-only since February 17, 2009. As the station's transmitter site typically becomes inaccessible to standard vehicles due to eastern Oregon's typically harsh winters, Northwest Broadcasting provided station engineers with snowmobiles on February 16, 2009 to complete the final post-transition installations.

On April 21, 2009, the station added a digital subchannel which includes This TV, but was changed to Telemundo in 2016.

Translators

References

External links

Fox network affiliates
Telemundo network affiliates
Television channels and stations established in 1999
Pendleton, Oregon
Television stations in Oregon
FFX-TV
1999 establishments in Oregon
Ion Television affiliates
Imagicomm Communications